大海, meaning "big sea" or "ocean", may refer to:
Ōmi Station (Aichi), Iida Line station in Shinshiro, Aichi Prefecture, Japan
Taikai, style of 
Album by Taiwan pop singer Chang Yu-sheng

People with the given name 大海 include:
Hu Dahai, Ming Dynasty general of China
Kwok Dai-hoi, character in Hidden Treasures (TV series)
Tong Dai-hoi, character in The Brink of Law